The Lowland Grassy Woodland, or the Illawarra and South Coast Lowland Grassy Woodland is a grassland-savannah community mostly found in the South Coast region of New South Wales, Australia. Stretching from the southern parts of the Illawarra in the north to the South East Corner in the south, it is an endangered ecological community that lies in a rain shadow area.

Geography
The community sits on granitic substrates (e.g. adamellites, granites, granodiorites, gabbros, etc.) but may also be found on locally precipitous sites and on acid volcanic, alluvial and fine-grained sedimentary substrates. They generally consist of an open tree canopy, a near-uninterrupted groundcover dominated by grasses and herbs, sometimes with stratums of shrubs and/or small trees. The bioregion incorporates: Bega Dry Grass Forest and Candelo Dry Grass Forest.

The ecoregion is found in the Bega Valley, Eurobodalla and Palerang Local Government Areas, with major presence to the west of Batemans Bay, close to Moruya, in the Araluen valley, Cobargo, Candelo, the Towamba Valley and near Tanja. The remaining environment of the community is gravely fragmented, with more than 95% of surviving patches estimated to be less than 10 ha.

Ecology
The grassy woodland is dominated by Eucalyptus tereticornis, Eucalyptus globoidea, Angophora floribunda, Eucalyptus melliodora, Eucalyptus pauciflora, Eucalyptus baueriana, Eucalyptus bosistoana, Eucalyptus maidenii and Eucalyptus viminalis. The understorey frequently features small trees like, Acacia mearnsii, Acacia implexa, Exocarpos cupressiformis and a shrub layer that features, Bursaria spinosa, Cassinia spp. and Ozothamnus diosmifolius. 

The groundcover features, Themeda australis, Microlaena stipoides and Eragrostis leptostachya, in addition to forbs such as Dichondra repens, Desmodium varians, Hydrocotyle laxiflora, Hypericum gramineum, Glycine clandestina and Cheilanthes sieberi.

Animals
Inhabitants of the grassy woodlands include Macropus robustus, Macropus parma, Thylogale thetis, Bettongia gaimardi, Dasyurus viverrinus and Phascogale tapoatafa.

References 

Geography of New South Wales
Grasslands of Australia
Remnant urban bushland
Vegetation of Australia
Temperate grasslands, savannas, and shrublands
Environment of New South Wales
Endangered Ecological Community